The Master of Life (German: Der Herr des Lebens) is a 1920 Austrian silent drama film directed by Jacob Fleck and Luise Fleck and starring Karl Ehmann, Liane Haid and Max Neufeld.

Cast
 Karl Ehmann as Assistant Dr. Forster 
 Liane Haid 
 Max Neufeld
 Wilhelm Klitsch

References

Bibliography
 Janelle Blankenship & Tobias Nag. European Visions: Small Cinemas in Transition. Transcript, 2015.

External links
 

1920 films
1920 drama films
Austrian black-and-white films
Austrian drama films
Austrian silent feature films
Films directed by Jacob Fleck
Films directed by Luise Fleck
Silent drama films